Jonathan Alberto Levi (born 23 January 1996) is a Swedish professional footballer who plays as a midfielder for Hungarian club Puskás Akadémia.

Club career

Youth years and early senior career
Levi grew up in the locality of Glumslöv, situated between the two cities Helsingborg and Landskrona, to a Swedish mother and an Italian father. He started playing football at the local club Glumslövs FF at a young age.

In 2013, he moved to Eskilsminne IF where he joined up with his older brother Christoffer Levi. He made his professional debut two years later in Division 1, the Swedish third tier. Levi however had a hard time breaking in to the squad and joined HIF Akademi, the feeder team of top flight club Helsingborgs IF, on loan during the summer of 2015. He scored 7 goals in 8 appearances for the fourth tier-side during his short loan spell.

Landskrona BoIS
Ahead of the 2016 season, Levi had a trial with Helsingborgs IF, but was not offered a contract by manager Henrik Larsson. He ultimately signed a two-year deal with Landskrona BoIS in the Swedish third tier.

Levi immediately established himself as a key player at Landskrona, operating on either of the two winger positions or playing as a central attacking midfielder. On 25 August 2016, Levi scored in 3-1–win against then reigning Swedish champions Malmö FF in the Swedish Cup. Even though Landskrona eventually missed out on a promotion, Levi enjoyed much success during his first full season at senior level, scoring 8 goals in 25 matches.

Östers IF
In November 2016, Levi was sold to Östers IF in Superettan. He signed a three-year deal with the Växjö-based club. Levi made his debut for his new side on 2 April 2017 in an away fixture against Falkenbergs FF, where he settled the score to 2-0 in stoppage time.

Levi went on to score 5 goals in 11 games during the first half of the 2017 season. His performances at Öster reportedly led to interest from BK Häcken, IFK Norrköping and Hammarby IF in Allsvenskan, the Swedish top tier.

Rosenborg BK
On 8 July 2017, Levi transferred to Rosenborg, reigning champions of Eliteserien. He signed a four and a half-year contract with the club, and the transfer fee was reportedly set at 8 million Swedish kronor with 2.1 million in additional bonuses (approximately £0.9 million in total).

Puskás Akadémia
On 23 January 2023, Levi signed a two-and-a-half-year contract with Puskás Akadémia in Hungary.

International career
In June 2017, Levi was called up to the Swedish U21 national team by manager Roland Nilsson for a training camp ahead of the 2019 UEFA European Under-21 Championship.

He made his debut for the Sweden national football team on 11 January 2019 in a friendly against Iceland, as a starter.

Personal life
Jonathan Levi has an Italian father.

Career statistics

Club

1 Includes Norwegian Super Cup matches.

Honours
Rosenborg
Eliteserien: 2017, 2018
Norwegian Football Cup: 2018
Mesterfinalen: 2018

References

External links
  (archive)
 
 
 
 

1996 births
People from Landskrona Municipality
Footballers from Skåne County
Swedish people of Italian descent
Living people
Association football midfielders
Swedish footballers
Sweden youth international footballers
Sweden under-21 international footballers
Sweden international footballers
Landskrona BoIS players
Östers IF players
Rosenborg BK players
IF Elfsborg players
IFK Norrköping players
Puskás Akadémia FC players
Allsvenskan players
Superettan players
Ettan Fotboll players
Eliteserien players
Nemzeti Bajnokság I players
Swedish expatriate footballers
Expatriate footballers in Norway
Swedish expatriate sportspeople in Norway
Expatriate footballers in Hungary
Swedish expatriate sportspeople in Hungary